La Union or La Unión (in Spanish for The Union) may refer to:

Places

Argentina
La Unión, Buenos Aires
La Unión, Salta

Chile
La Unión, Chile

Colombia
La Unión, Antioquia
La Unión, Nariño
La Unión, Sucre
La Unión, Valle del Cauca

Costa Rica
La Unión Canton

Cuba
La Unión, Cienfuegos

El Salvador
La Unión Department
La Unión, El Salvador

Honduras
La Unión, Copán
La Unión, Olancho

Mexico
La Unión, Guerrero
La Unión, Quintana Roo

Peru
La Unión Province, Peru
La Unión District, Dos de Mayo, district of the Dos de Mayo province in Huánuco
La Unión District, Piura, district of the Piura province in Piura
La Unión District, Tarma, district of the Tarma province in Junín
La Unión, Huánuco, capital of the Dos de Mayo province in Huánuco

Philippines
La Union province

Spain
La Unión, Murcia

United States
La Union, New Mexico

Other uses

 La Unión (ship), a ship used to traffick enslaved Mayans from Mexico to Cuba from 1855 to 1861
 La Unión (band), a Spanish pop/rock band

See also
 Unión (disambiguation)
Union (disambiguation)